Agustín Nadruz Blanco (born 29 June 1996) is a Uruguayan professional footballer who plays as a midfielder for Curicó Unido.

Career

Club
Nadruz began his career with Rocha de Cilindro's academy, before being signed by Peñarol. Fellow Uruguayan Primera División side Boston River signed Nadruz on loan in July 2016, which preceded a permanent move a year later. He was an unused substitute in February 2017 against Racing Club, before making his professional debut in the league on 18 March during a defeat away to Cerro. His first senior goal arrived versus Racing Club in the 2018 Uruguayan Primera División season, a campaign which saw Nadruz depart Boston River midway to join Atlético de Rafaela of Primera B Nacional.

International
Nadruz represented Uruguay at U15 and U17 level. He won twenty-three caps for the U15s from 2010, prior to featuring six times and scoring once for the U17s in 2011.

Career statistics
.

References

External links

1996 births
Living people
Footballers from Montevideo
Uruguayan footballers
Uruguayan expatriate footballers
Uruguay youth international footballers
Association football midfielders
Uruguayan Primera División players
Primera Nacional players
Chilean Primera División players
Boston River players
Atlético de Rafaela footballers
Curicó Unido footballers
Expatriate footballers in Chile
Uruguayan expatriate sportspeople in Chile
Expatriate footballers in Argentina
Uruguayan expatriate sportspeople in Argentina